The Carolina Tar Heels was an American old time string band. It originally consisted of Dock Walsh (July 23, 1901 – May 28, 1967) on banjo and Gwen Foster on harmonica.  Later Clarence Ashley (September 29, 1895 – June 2, 1967) joined on guitar and Garley Foster (January 10, 1905 – October 5, 1968) would replace Gwen on harmonica. Despite sharing a surname Gwen and Garley were not related.

The Carolina Tar Heels were active in the 1920s, and disbanded in 1932.

Discography
The Carolina Tar Heels (Folk Legacy, 1964)
The Carolina Tar Heels (GHP, 1969)
The Carolina Tar Heels (Bear Family, 1975)
The Original Carolina Tar Heels: Look Who's Coming! (Old Homestead, 1978)

References

External links
 Illustrated Dock Walsh / Carolina Tar Heels discography
 

1920s establishments in the United States
1932 disestablishments in the United States
American country music groups
Musical groups established in the 1920s
Musical groups disestablished in 1932
Old-time bands